Schouwen is the name of a former island of the Dutch province of Zeeland.

The island of Schouwen was joined to Duiveland in 1610, forming the island of Schouwen-Duiveland. It is the western part of the current island.

References 

Former islands of Zeeland
History of Schouwen-Duiveland